Parker Mackay is a Canadian former ice hockey right wing. He was named as the NCAA Tournament Most Outstanding Player for Minnesota Duluth during the program's national championship in 2019.

Career
Mackay was a key contributor for his junior team, the Spruce Grove Saints, and helped them capture back-to-back AJHL championships. After captaining the team in his final year of junior hockey, Mackay began attending the University of Minnesota Duluth and began his college career as a depth player. As a sophomore, Mackay doubled his scoring production and helped the Bulldogs march all the way to the NCAA championship game. As a reward for his leadership and defensive play, Mackay was named as an alternate captain for his junior season and responded by increasing his point total once more. While Mackay was improving, however, Duluth didn't have nearly as good of a season in 2018. Fortunately for the Bulldogs, their record was still good enough to get them into the NCAA Tournament for the fourth consecutive season. Despite playing in his 7th postseason game, Mackay finally recorded his first point in NCAA Tournament play in the opening match when he scored the game-winning goal against Minnesota State, completing the team's comeback from a 0–2 deficit. Mackay only recorded one more assist in the tournament but his steady defensive play helped the Bulldogs win three consecutive 2–1 decisions en route to a national championship.

Mackay returned for his senior season and was named team captain. He responded with his best offensive season by far, leading the team in goals and points. The Bulldogs were once more a defensive juggernaut and earned the second overall seed for the NCAA Tournament. Despite high hopes, however, the team found itself down 0–1 with less than five minutes to play in their opening match. Mackay took it upon himself to fix things and not only scored the tying goal but netted the game-winner in overtime as well. Duluth relaxed after the near-disaster and won their next two games comfortably, sending them to their third consecutive championship game. Mackay again led the way, scoring the opening goal less than 4 minutes into the contest and added an assist on the insurance marker. Minnesota Duluth won the game 3–0 and Mackay was named as the Tournament MOP. In addition to the honor, Mackay also finished his college career with 14 NCAA tournament games to his credit, more than any other player.

After graduating, Mackay played the following season with the Texas Stars but it was mostly forgettable stint. Due in part to the COVID-19 pandemic, Mackay travelled to Europe for his second season of professional hockey and had a bit of a resurgence with the Graz99ers. In December, however, Mackay announced his retirement as a player citing health reasons.

Career statistics

Regular season and playoffs

Awards and honors

References

External links

1994 births
Living people
Canadian ice hockey right wingers
Ice hockey people from Alberta
People from Irma, Alberta
Spruce Grove Saints players
Minnesota Duluth Bulldogs men's ice hockey players
Texas Stars players
Graz 99ers players